I Am Bruce Lee is a 2012 documentary film directed by Pete McCormack. The film documents the life of Bruce Lee, the famous actor and martial artist, featuring interviews with is widow Linda Emery and daughter Shannon Lee. It won a Leo Award in 2012.

External links
 

2012 films
Films about Bruce Lee
Documentary films about actors
American martial arts films
2012 martial arts films
Films directed by Pete McCormack
2010s English-language films
2010s American films